"Grew Up A Screw Up" is the second single from Ludacris' Release Therapy. The song features Young Jeezy and a sample of The Notorious B.I.G. who sings the hook "I grew up a fucking screw up."
Curiously, in the video, Young Jeezy raps a verse different from the one which appeared on the Release Therapy album. The video premiered on BET's 106 & Park as a New Joint on Friday October 13, 2006. The video has already been released on MTV Jams.

Music video
The music video's concept is not as complex as other videos featuring Ludacris. It is shot outdoors, where Ludacris and Young Jeezy rap. Behind them is a screen that shows videos and pictures of the places where they grew up. It was directed by Chaka Zulu and premiered on BET's 106 & Park on October 13, 2006.

Remix
The official remix is the video version with an alternate Young Jeezy verse. Rapper's Lil Wayne, 2 Chainz, and Brisco freestyled over the beat on Lil Wayne's mixtape 'Lil Weezy Ana Vol. 1'.

Credits and personnel
The credits for "Grew Up a Screw Up" are adapted from the liner notes of Release Therapy.
Recording
 Recorded at: The Ludaplex and Thug Mansion Studios, both in Atlanta, Georgia and Nasty's Crib in Orlando, Florida.

Personnel
 Ludacris – vocals, songwriting
 DJ Nasty & LVM – producers
 Young Jeezy – vocals, songwriting
 Johnny Mollings – songwriting
 Lenny Mollings – songwriting, recording, guitar
 Joshua Monroy – recording
 Tony Rey – recording
 Phil Tan – mixing
 Josh Houghkirk – additional engineering
 Osten Harvey, Jr. – songwriting
 Marshall Mathers – songwriting
 Luis Edgardo Resto – songwriting
 Tupac Shakur – songwriting
 Chris Wallace – songwriting
 Edgar Winter – songwriting
 Bernie Grundman – mastering

Samples
 Contains elements of "Runnin' (Dying to Live)", performed by The Notorious B.I.G. and 2Pac and written by Osten Harvey, Jr., Marshall Mathers, Luis Edgardo Resto, Tupac Shakur, Chris Wallace and Edgar Winter.

Charts

References

External links

2006 singles
2006 songs
Ludacris songs
Jeezy songs
Def Jam Recordings singles
Songs written by Ludacris
Songs written by Jeezy
Songs written by Eminem
Songs written by the Notorious B.I.G.
Gangsta rap songs